Survivor: Fiji is the fourteenth season of the American CBS competitive reality television series Survivor. The season was filmed in the Fiji Islands from October 30 until December 7, 2006, and aired from February 8, 2007 until the two-hour season finale on May 13, 2007, followed by a live reunion from Ed Sullivan Theater in New York City, where Earl Cole was named the Sole Survivor over Andria "Dreamz" Herd and Cassandra Franklin in the first unanimous vote of the show's history.

This is, to date, the only season of Survivor to have an odd number of castaways, with 19, after a 20th castaway, Mellisa McNulty, withdrew the night before filming began. Due to the timing and lack of alternates, her spot could not be replaced. Gary Stritesky was the only contestant who applied to be on the show; McNulty and the other 18 contestants were recruited. The cast maintained a similarly racially diverse cast (with the intended 20 person cast containing equal amounts of African American, Asian American, Hispanic American, and European American castaways) as Survivor: Cook Islands, in a conscious effort intended to show that the racial diversity of Survivor: Cook Islands was not just a ratings stunt.

Overview

Gameplay
This season introduced the "Haves vs. Have Nots" twist, regarded as one of the worst twists in Survivor history. At the start of the season, the 19 castaways lived on a single beach and built a furnished camp, including shelters built from pre-cut wood, a kitchen area with dishware, a shower, a toilet, furniture, and the means to maintain fire, with supplies provided by the production. When the castaways were divided into two tribes, the winning tribe, Moto, won the furnished camp while the losing tribe, Ravu, had to build a new camp from scratch, and given merely a pot and a machete to survive. During the broadcast of the season, host Jeff Probst admitted that this concept did not play out quite as the producers hoped, as it led to the "haves" tribe predictably dominating in the challenges over the "have-nots" week after week. Exile Island returned once again for Fiji, with new twists. Unlike previous seasons, there were two hidden immunity idols, with one hidden at each camp. The idol now had to be played before Jeff read the results of the voting, rather than after. Once a hidden immunity idol was used, it was rehidden rather than discarded. The idols were playable through the final five.

Contestants
The two tribes were Moto and Ravu, meaning "spear" and "to kill" in Fijian respectively, while the merged tribe Bula Bula means "welcome" or "hello" in Fijian. Notable contestants on this season including Miss Venezuela 1988 contestant Rita Verreos.

Future appearances
Yau-Man Chan later appeared in Survivor: Micronesia. Outside of Survivor, Earl Cole appeared on an episode of the thirteenth season of Shark Tank. He was also a contestant on the 2022 USA Network reality competition series Snake in the Grass.

Season summary
Due to one player dropping out prior to the game, the season started with 19 players. After arriving at their beach as one group, instructions and materials for building a camp were dropped from a plane. Before the first challenge, the castaways were divided into two tribes by Sylvia, appointed for her leadership in building the camp, who was sent to Exile Island due to the odd number of players. After the challenge, the winning team, Moto, returned to the constructed camp, while the losing team, Ravu, was directed to a different beach where only meager supplies awaited them; Sylvia joined Ravu shortly afterwards. While both tribes vied equally in challenges, it was clear Moto was in much better shape due to the better camp, winning every single challenge. On Ravu, an alliance between Earl and Yau-Man was formed. When Earl was sent to Exile Island, he conspired with Yau-Man to find a hidden immunity idol located at the camp, which Yau-Man did.

A tribal shuffle served to further alliances; Earl and Yau-Man brought Michelle, Cassandra and Boo into their fold, while Alex became the leader of an alliance between himself, Mookie, Edgardo, and Dreamz, titling themselves the "Four Horsemen". Mookie found the other hidden immunity idol, but decided not to tell Dreamz because of the latter's lack of trustworthiness. The tribes merged at the original Moto camp, stripped of their original structures and luxuries. The first post-merge immunity challenge divided the contestants into two randomly selected teams, putting Michelle with most of the Horsemen, and leading to her being voted out. After Dreamz discovered his alliance had neglected to tell him about Mookie's idol, he defected to Earl's alliance and worked with them to trick Mookie into misplaying his idol. Stacy joined their alliance and suggested targeting Edgardo, resulting in the systematic eliminations of the three loyal Horsemen.

The reward challenge played by the final six players was for a truck. Yau-Man won the challenge, but made a deal with Dreamz to trade the truck in exchange for the final challenge's immunity necklace should Dreamz win it. While Dreamz attempted to get out of the deal by targeting Yau-Man immediately, Yau-Man played his idol and Stacy was sent home, followed by Boo for being a physical threat. Dreamz won the final immunity challenge, but reneged on his deal with Yau-Man at the subsequent Tribal Council; Yau-Man was the final player voted out. At the final Tribal Council, Dreamz's actions and Cassandra's quiet game led the jury to vote unanimously for Earl.

In the case of multiple tribes or castaways who win reward or immunity, they are listed in order of finish, or alphabetically where it was a team effort; where one castaway won and invited others, the invitees are in brackets.

Episodes

Voting history

Filming locations
Tribal Council, the production camp ("Tent City"), and several challenges were located in close proximity to the village of Vunivutu. Other challenges were held on Katawaqa Island, Tivi Island, Vatudamu Point, and fields along the Wainikoro River.
The Moto (and later Bula Bula) tribe lived on a peninsula in Vunivutu Bay, while the Ravu tribe lived on Druadrua Island under much harsher conditions. Exile Island's actual name is Sausau Island.
Reward getaways included trips to the Namale Resort and Jean-Michel Cousteau Fiji Islands Resort in the town of Savusavu, as well as a rafting excursion on the Navua River on Fiji's main island of Viti Levu.

Political turmoil in Fiji

On December 5, 2006 (two days before the Final Tribal Council), a coup d'état was initiated by Fiji's military leader, Frank Bainimarama. While there was some speculation that a full evacuation of the Survivor crew members from Fiji would take place, only a few crew members on the mainland were relocated to the second-smallest island. However, the political turmoil prior to the coup did prevent the families of the cast members from coming to Fiji to participate in a reward challenge (as usually occurs on Survivor) that occurred towards the end of filming.

Reception
Survivor: Fiji was met with generally negative reception. Entertainment Weekly columnist Dalton Ross ranked Fiji as the third-worst season of the series, only better than Nicaragua and Island of the Idols, saying "With the exception of Yau-Man and Earl, a true bummer of a cast, and the 'Haves vs. Have-Nots' twist was one of the worst creative decisions in Survivor history." In 2010,  host Jeff Probst, also ranked it as the third-worst season ahead of Survivor: Marquesas and Survivor: Thailand, cited Yau-Man and Dreamz as the only good things about the season, and had it not been for them, Fiji would've ranked lower on his list than Thailand. Fiji is ranked as the worst season of all time by Examiner.com, and the fourth-worst season by Zap2it, only behind Survivor: Vanuatu, Thailand, and Survivor: Redemption Island. From 2012 to 2014, Survivor fan site "Survivor Oz" consistently ranked Fiji in the bottom four worst seasons in its annual polls ranking every season of the series; In 2012, it was 4th-worst ahead of Thailand, Nicaragua, and Redemption Island, and in 2013 and 2014, it was the 3rd-worst ahead of Survivor: South Pacific and Redemption Island. In 2015, a poll by Rob Has a Podcast ranked Fiji as the fifth-worst season of the series, only ahead of Nicaragua, Thailand, One World, and Redemption Island, with Rob Cesternino ranking this season 25th out of 30. This was updated in 2021 during Cesternino's podcast, Survivor All-Time Top 40 Rankings, ranking 28th out of 40th. That same year, however, Kristen Kranz of Collider gave the season a positive review and ranked Fiji as the 10th best season of the series. She also wrote that the big move made by Herd saved the season from being mediocre, praised Chan's gameplay, and said that Cole was a "great, deserving winner."

References

External links
 Official CBS Survivor Fiji Website

Macuata Province
14
2007 American television seasons
2006 in Fiji
Television shows filmed in Fiji
Television shows set in Fiji